Lucy Sparrow (born 8 July 1986) is a contemporary artist originating from Bath, England. She works at the intersection of contemporary art and craft setting the agenda for textiles within the urban art scene. She works mainly with felt and wool, creating life-sized replicas in addition to oversized soft versions of existing objects. Her work often features the SSRI prescription drug Prozac and often features Sparrows interpretations of the retail environment, the intricacies of product branding throughout the modern era and her full-sized representations of supermarkets.

In the early stages of her career, Sparrow was involved in a number of notable group shows in the UK. She was a contributor to the Victoria and Albert Museum 2013 travelling street art collection alongside Banksy, Blek le Rat, Jamie Hewlett, Pure Evil, D*Face and urban illustrator Oh Jiwon. Her first solo show at Hoxton Gallery was Imitation, which recreated famous artworks out of felt, including a shark in a tank by Damien Hirst.

Following from her participation in group shows, Sparrow launched her first UK solo show in 2014 before moving on to release her first international solo show, 8 'till Late in 2017 in America. Since 2017, Sparrow has continued to exhibit globally across America and Asia in addition to the UK.

Solo Shows

The Cornershop 

In 2014, Sparrow created a Kickstarter campaign to fund her first major exhibition. The Cornershop was a soft sculpture recreation of a British newsagent's installed in a derelict cornershop in East London. According to news sources, it took Sparrow and her assistant seven months and 300 sq. metres of felt to create the 4,000 items on display.

The Warmongery 

Following from The Cornershop, Sparrow created The Warmongery show in Boxpark, located in Bethnall Green, East London. Lucy stated that "The aim of Warmongery is to draw people’s attention to what drives a few individuals to stockpile weapons and to ask why people are growing up in a world where a tiny minority feel so stressed and frustrated that they want to kill people.". The Warmongery ran for 10 days in total.

Madame Roxy's Erotic Emporium 

In 2015, Lucy Sparrow made an installation of a sex shop in London's Soho, saying that her inspiration for the work was her five years working as a stripper in a nightclub in London, and that she wished to make people question the increasing suppression of some sexual practices in British law such as use of sex toys and contraception, and the gentrification of Soho. The exhibition was called Madame Roxy's Erotic Emporium and included pornographic magazines, whips, toys and jars full of STIs.

8 'till Late
In June 2017, Sparrow installed a felt replica of a bodega in The Standard, High Line hotel in New York City. 8 'till Late opened on June 5 and featured 9,000 items. The show was an instant success, requiring Sparrow to temporarily close the show after 7 days to restock. The show was intended to run for 4 weeks but was again forced to close 9 days early following a sell-out of all pieces.

Sparrow Mart 
In August 2018, Sparrow released Sparrow Mart, a life-sized replica of a supermarket. The supermarket represented Sparrows fifth major art installation and was built within The Standard, a hotel in Downtown LA. Sparrow Mart featured 31,000 felt grocery items and covered over 2,800 square feet of retail space.

Lucy Sparrow's Felt Art Imaginarium 
In July 2019, Sparrow created Lucy Sparrow's Felt Art Imaginarium at M WOODS museum in Beijing, China. This show featured 70 items remade from Sparrows chosen medium, felt. The show opened on July 6, 2019, and remained open until October 7, 2019. Sparrow created full-size versions of masterpieces from Michelangelo's David and da Vinci's Mona Lisa to Damien Hirst's shark in formaldehyde and Andy Warhol's Campbell's soup cans. Sparrow spent 9 months creating the show which spanned 14 rooms within the museum.

Sixth Avenue Delicatessen 
in October 2019 Sparrow reprised her New York City run with the Sixth Avenue Delicatessen show, which ran from October 1 until October 20, 2019. The show was hosted at the Rockefeller Center on Sixth Avenue where she offered some thirty thousand felt replications of perishable food items for sale. Sixth Avenue Delicatessen featured a run of 30,000 felt items created by Sparrow. The show was organised by the Art Production Fund and ran for a total of 3 weeks.

The Bourdon Street Chemist 
In December 2020 Sparrow announced her upcoming London show, The Bourdon Street Chemist. The show is located within the Lyndsey Ingram gallery in Mayfair, London and was originally scheduled to open in January 2021. However, the show was postponed due to restrictions imposed by the UK Government relating to the COVID-19 pandemic. The show has been rescheduled to April 2021.

External links 

Official websites:
  - Official Lucy Sparrow Webpage
 Lucy Sparrow Instagram – Official Lucy Sparrow Instagram page
 Lucy Sparrow Facebook – Official Lucy Sparrow Facebook page

References 

Living people
1986 births
English artists
20th-century English painters
21st-century English painters
Artists from Bath, Somerset